St Mary's Church is a Grade I listed parish church in the Church of England in Kersey, Suffolk.

The Shrine at St Mary's 
In Medieval times St Mary's was an important site of pilgrimage with a shrine filling the whole north aisle. This survived Henry VIII's dissolution program but was destroyed around the time of the Civil War. On 8 March 2020 the shrine was re-hallowed and more information can be found at www.kerseychurch.org

 The newly re-hallowed Shrine and church is host to arts and music events. Jazz evenings take place twice a year, classical music concerts, film evenings, dances and various other events happen regularly. The co-ordinator can be reached at kerseychurch.org/fosm

The Shrine was rehallowed in the presence of Leading Aircraftman Dougie Vince. The bomber on which he served as engineer was attacked by an ME 109 as they returned from a raid on western Germany. The navigation instruments were destroyed and a fire started toward the rear of the aircraft. The navigator had no positional fix and fuel was critically low. The RAF, however, had installed two searchlights in the churchyard of St Mary's Kersey which illuminated the church tower, giving pilots a known navigational reference point. As a result, the church gained the nickname of the “Thank God Church”. Mr Vince's bomber fixed their position and landed at a nearby airfield. The tail gunner died in the fire and Leading Aircraftman Vince's hand was almost burnt away as he fought the flames using an extinguisher that had become red hot in the flames.

History

The oldest parts of the church date to the twelfth century. A reconstruction of the church is thought to have started with the north aisle which was joined to the nave by an arcade and completed in 1335. Work then started on the tower, but was delayed by the outbreak of the black death in 1349. The tower was completed in 1481 and the north and south porches were then added.

External and internal architecture

The church is of flint and stone and stands on high ground to the south of the village. In about 1335 the north aisle was built and the tower's foundations laid. The tower was completed in 1481. The tower has four stages. There are diagonal buttresses, a castellated parapet with flint chequerwork and an octagonal stair turret. The south porch has two bays with buttresses rising to crocketted pinnacles. The north porch is similar but less elaborate.

Inside the church, the ceiling has moulded and carved beams and carved panels. The nave roof has hammer beams alternating with tie beams with arched braces meeting in the centre. There are two baptismal fonts, one 12th-century and another 15th-century. There is a 15th-century lectern and chancel screen. The north aisle has a defaced stone carved frieze.

The chancel was rebuilt in 1862 by King's College, Cambridge, and a small vestry was added in the north east corner.

Internal fittings

Organ

The church contains a two manual pipe organ by Bishop & Son of Ipswich and London. A specification of the organ may be found on the National Pipe Organ Register. It was resited in 2012–3 to make room for kitchen and toilet facilities at the west end of the north aisle.

Tower
The tower is home to a community book crossing, housing over one hundred books. The resource was used extensively during Covid times and is much loved by the community. Weddings and funerals enter through the 15th century West doors, noting the curiously off-set tower, nave and chancel. The tower contains eight bells.

Rood screen
The church is noted for retaining a small section of its medieval rood screen. It was recovered from a local farm and restored. The panels show saints and kings, one of the Kings being Edmund the Martyr, shown holding an arrow.

Parish status
The church is part of a benefice which includes four other parishes:
St Mary's Church, Aldham
St Peter's Church, Elmsett
St Nicholas' Church, Hintlesham
All Saints and St Margaret's Church, Chattisham

Clergy

Thomas Clarke 158
Robert Gumyill 1607 - 1613
Thomas Miller 1635
John Sloper 1638 - 1644
John Burgess 1644 - 1646
William Alcocke 1647 - 1653
Nathaniel Snow 1654 - 1666
Thomas Horne 1670 - 1683
George Wroth 1683 - 1686
George Williams 1686 - 1689
Gregory Doughty 1689 - 1724
Charles Thackham 1724 - 1725
Everard Sturgis 1725
John Lane ???? - 1740
Nathaniel Kent 1740 - 1766
John Howes 1766 - 1773
Henry Ingles 1773 - 1774
Alexander Akehurst 1775 - 1777
James Chatres 1777 - 1778
John Gee Smith 1782 - 1785
William Cole 1785 - 1787
William Moore 1787 - 1789
Thomas Barrow 1789 - 1801
Thomas Hart during 1797
Joshua Hird 1801 - 1803
Joah Furey 1803 - 1807
Sterling Kelty 1807 - 1810
Stephen Hurnard Hawtrey 1810 - 1812
Sterling Kelty 1812 - 1817
Alfred James Trash 1817 - 1823
Charles Hatch 1823 - 1836
Charles Chapman 1836 - 1849
Abraham Humie 1849 - 1878
Cecil Gordon Moore 1878
Alford Dean Mozeley 1878
William Brice Gray 1879 - 1907
Alford Dean Mozeley 1878
William Brice Gray 1879 - 1907
Frank Benet Phillips 1907 - 1915
Thomas Harding Soulby 1915 - 1922
Daniel Kent Ambrose 1922 - 1936
Roger Ernest Tempest 1936 - 1942
William Walter Lillie 1942 - 1947
William Hugh Nottage Mumford 1947 - 1955
Sydney Edward Caller 1955 - 1961
Howard Donald Lewis Thomas 1961 - 1967
Christopher R. W. Goddard 1968 - 1973
Henry Tait 1974 - 1975
Albert Richard Johnstone 1975 - 1980
Gerald Harrison 1981 - 1988
William James Sands 1989 - 1922
Ian A Wilson 1993 - 2002
Janet M Simpson 2003
Trisha & Tim Ffrench 2007
Jackson Crompton-Battersby 2018

References

Church of England church buildings in Suffolk
Grade I listed churches in Suffolk
St Mary's Church